Federalist No. 72 is an essay by Alexander Hamilton, the seventy-second of The Federalist Papers. It was published on March 19, 1788, under the pseudonym Publius. The paper, titled "The Same Subject Continued, and Re-Eligibility of the Executive Considered, discusses executive re-eligibility and is the sixth in a series of 11 essays discussing the powers the Executive branch.

Executive re-eligibility
In Federalist No. 72, Alexander Hamilton argues that re-eligibility is essential to executive power.  He believed that the Presidency must attract the most ambitious individuals and re-eligibility ensured that they would not attempt to extend their term in office unconstitutionally.

Hamilton believed that executives should be eligible to serve as many terms as the American people allow. He argued that limits on re-eligibility would hamper an experienced president to use his past expertise. In addition, Hamilton argued that term limits prevent an executive from utilizing experience gained in special emergency situations in other terms and that term limits restricts stability within the executive.

The twenty-second Amendment to the Constitution imposed the present two-tier term limit on the executive branch. Today, U.S. presidents can only serve two terms, or if a succession has taken place, ten years, as president of the country.

External links 

 Text of The Federalist No. 72: congress.gov
The Federalist No. 72 Text

72
1788 in American law
1788 essays
1788 in the United States
Term limits